Yelena Sinchukova (née Ivanova; born 23 January 1961) is a retired Russian athlete who specialised in the long jump. She competed at the 1996 Summer Olympics, as well as two World Championships.

Sinchukova was born in Kemerovo. Early in her career she competed in the combined events and later sometimes also participated in the triple jump.

Her personal bests in the long jump are 7.20 metres outdoors (Budapest 1991) and 6.84 metres indoors (Chișinău 1995).

International competitions

See also
List of European Athletics Championships medalists (women)
List of European Athletics Indoor Championships medalists (women)

References

1961 births
Living people
People from Kemerovo
Sportspeople from Kemerovo Oblast
Russian female long jumpers
Russian female triple jumpers
Russian pentathletes
Soviet female long jumpers
Soviet female triple jumpers
Soviet pentathletes
Olympic athletes of Russia
Athletes (track and field) at the 1996 Summer Olympics
World Athletics Championships athletes for Russia
World Athletics Championships athletes for the Soviet Union
European Athletics Championships medalists
Soviet Athletics Championships winners
Russian Athletics Championships winners